Farhud was the pogrom or "violent dispossession" carried out against the Jewish population of Baghdad, Iraq, on June 1–2, 1941, immediately following the British victory in the Anglo-Iraqi War. The riots occurred in a power vacuum following the collapse of the pro-Nazi government of Rashid Ali while the city was in a state of instability. The violence came immediately after the rapid defeat of Rashid Ali by British forces, whose earlier coup had generated a short period of national euphoria, and was fueled by allegations that Iraqi Jews had aided the British. Over 180 Jews were killed and 1,000 injured, although some non-Jewish rioters were also killed in the attempt to quell the violence. Looting of Jewish property took place and 900 Jewish homes were destroyed.

The Farhud took place during the Jewish holiday of Shavuot. It has been referred to as a pogrom which was part of the Holocaust, although such comparison has been disputed. The event spurred the migration of Iraqi Jews out of the country, although a direct connection to the 1951–1952 Jewish exodus from Iraq is also disputed, as many Jews who left Iraq immediately following the Farhud returned to the country and permanent emigration did not accelerate significantly until 1950–1951. According to Hayyim Cohen, the Farhud "was the only [such event] known to the Jews of Iraq, at least during their last hundred years of life there". Historian Edy Cohen writes that up until the Farhud, Jews had enjoyed relatively favorable conditions and coexistence with Muslims in Iraq.

Background

Iraq Jewish Community

There were many instances of violence against Jews during their long history in Iraq, as well as numerous enacted decrees ordering the destruction of synagogues in Iraq, and some forced conversion to Islam.

Independence of Iraq
After the Ottoman Empire was defeated in the First World War, the League of Nations granted the mandate of Iraq to Britain. After King Ghazi who inherited the throne of Faisal I, died in a 1939 car accident, Britain installed 'Abd al-Ilah as Iraq's governing regent.

By 1941, the approximately 150,000 Iraqi Jews played active roles in many aspects of Iraqi life, including farming, banking, commerce and the government bureaucracy.

Iraq in World War II
Iraqi nationalist Rashid Ali al-Gaylani was appointed Prime Minister again in 1940, and attempted to ally with the Axis powers in order to remove the remaining British influence in the country.

Much of the population had retained significant anti-British sentiments since the 1920 Iraqi revolt, although the Jewish population was viewed as pro-British during World War II, contributing to the separation of the Muslim and Jewish communities.

In addition, between 1932 and 1941, the German embassy in Iraq, headed by Dr. Fritz Grobba, significantly supported antisemitic and fascist movements. Intellectuals and army officers were invited to Germany as guests of the Nazi party, and antisemitic material was published in the newspapers. The German embassy purchased the newspaper Al-alam Al-arabi ("The Arab world") which published, in addition to antisemitic propaganda, a translation of Mein Kampf in Arabic. The German embassy also supported the establishment of Al-Fatwa, a youth organization based upon the model of the Hitler Youth.

Events preceding the Farhud

The Golden Square coup

In 1941, a group of pro-Nazi Iraqi officers, known as the "Golden Square" and led by General Rashid Ali, overthrew Regent Abdul Ilah on April 1 after staging a successful coup. The coup had significant popular support, particularly in Baghdad. Historian Orit Bashkin writes that "All, apparently, yearned for the departure of the British after two long decades of interference in Iraqi affairs".

Iraq's new government then was quickly involved in confrontation with the British over the terms of the military treaty forced on Iraq at independence. The treaty gave the British unlimited rights to base troops in Iraq and transit troops through Iraq. The British arranged to land large numbers of soldiers from India in Iraq to force the country to show its intentions. Iraq refused to let them land and confrontations afterward occurred both near Basra in the south and to the west of Baghdad near the British base complex and airfield. The Germans dispatched a group of 26 heavy fighters to aid in a futile air attack on the British airbase at Habbaniya which accomplished nothing.

Winston Churchill sent a telegram to President Franklin D. Roosevelt, warning him that if the Middle East fell to Germany, victory against the Nazis would be a "hard, long and bleak proposition" given that Hitler would have access to the oil reserves there. The telegram dealt with the larger issues of war in the Middle East rather than Iraq exclusively.

On May 25, Hitler issued his Order 30, stepping up German offensive operations: "The Arab Freedom Movement in the Middle East is our natural ally against England. In this connection special importance is attached to the liberation of Iraq ... I have therefore decided to move forward in the Middle East by supporting Iraq."

On May 30, the British-organized force called Kingcol led by Brigadier J.J. Kingstone reached Baghdad, causing the "Golden Square" and their supporters to escape via Iran to Germany. Kingcol included some elements of the Arab Legion led by Major John Bagot Glubb known as Glubb Pasha.

On May 31, Regent Abdul Illah prepared to fly back into Baghdad to reclaim his leadership. To avoid the impression of a British-organized countercoup, the regent entered Baghdad without a British escort.

Michael Eppel, in his book "The Palestinian Conflict in Modern Iraq" blames the Farhud on the influence of German ideology on the Iraqi people, as well as extreme nationalism, both of which were heightened by the Golden Square coup.

Antisemitic actions preceding the Farhud
Sami Michael, a witness to the Farhud, testified: "Antisemite propaganda was broadcast routinely by the local radio and Radio Berlin in Arabic. Various anti-Jewish slogans were written on walls on the way to school, such as "Hitler was killing the Jewish germs". Shops owned by Muslims had 'Muslim' written on them, so they would not be damaged in the case of anti-Jewish riots."

Shalom Darwish, the secretary of the Jewish community in Baghdad, testified that several days before the Farhud, the homes of Jews were marked with a red palm print ("Hamsa"), by al-Futuwa youth.

Two days before the Farhud, Yunis al-Sabawi, a government minister who proclaimed himself the governor of Baghdad, summoned Rabbi Sasson Khaduri, the community leader, and recommended to him that Jews stay in their homes for the next three days as a protective measure. This may have been due to an intention to harm the Jews in their homes, or he may have been expressing his fear for the safety of the community in light of the prevalent atmosphere in Baghdad.

During the fall of the Rashid Ali government, false rumors were circulated that Jews used radios to signal the Royal Air Force and distributed British propaganda.

Farhud (June 1–2, 1941)

According to Iraqi government and British historical sources violence started when a delegation of Jewish Iraqis arrived at the Palace of Flowers (Qasr al Zuhur) to meet with the Regent Abdullah, and were attacked en route by an Iraqi Arab mob as they crossed Al Khurr Bridge. Iraqi Arab civil disorder and violence then swiftly spread to the Al Rusafa and Abu Sifyan districts, and got worse the next day when elements of the Iraqi police began joining in with the attacks upon the Jewish population, involving shops belonging to it being set on fire and a synagogue being destroyed.

However, Zvi Yehuda, a professor of Jewish Studies, has suggested that the event that set off the rioting was anti-Jewish preaching in the Jami-Al-Gaylani mosque, and that the violence was premeditated rather than a spontaneous outburst.

Mordechai Ben-Porat, who later became the leader of the Iraqi Zionists, described his experience as follows:
We were mostly cut off from the center of the Jewish community and our Muslim neighbors became our friends. It was because of one Muslim neighbor, in fact, that we survived the Farhoud. We had no weapons to defend ourselves and were utterly helpless. We put furniture up against the doors and windows to prevent the rioters from breaking in. Then, Colonel Arif's wife came rushing out of her house with a grenade and a pistol and shouted at the rioters, 'If you don’t leave, I will explode this grenade right here!' Her husband was apparently not home and she had either been instructed by him to defend us or decided on her own to help. They dispersed, and that was that – she saved our lives.

The dean of Midrash Bet Zilkha Yaakov Mutzafi raced to open up the gates of the yeshiva to shelter the victims of the Farhud who were displaced from their homes, and secured money for their upkeep from philanthropists in the community.

Civil order was restored after two days of violence in the afternoon of June 2, when British troops imposed a curfew and shot violators on sight. An investigation conducted by British journalist Tony Rocca of the Sunday Times attributed the delay to a personal decision by Kinahan Cornwallis, the British Ambassador to Iraq, who failed to immediately carry out orders he received from the Foreign Office in the matter, and initially denied requests from British Imperial military and civil officers on the scene for permission to act against the attacking Arab mobs. The British also delayed their entry into Baghdad for 48 hours, which some testimonies suggest was due to having ulterior motives in allowing a clash to happen between Muslims and Jews in the city.

Casualties
The exact number of victims is uncertain. With respect to Jewish victims, some sources say that about 180 Jewish Iraqis were killed and about 240 were wounded, 586 Jewish-owned businesses were looted and 99 Jewish houses were destroyed. Other accounts state that nearly 200 were killed and over 2, 000 injured, while 900 Jewish homes and hundreds of Jewish-owned shops destroyed and looted. The Israeli-based Babylonian Jewry Heritage Center maintains that in addition to 180 identified victims, around another 600 unidentified ones were buried in a mass grave. Zvi Zameret of Israel's Education Ministry says 180 were killed and 700 wounded. Bashkin writes that "a constant element that appears in most accounts of the Farhud is a narrative relating to a good neighbor [...] Judging by the lists of the Jewish dead, it seems that Jews in mixed neighborhoods stood a better chance of surviving the riots than those in uniformly Jewish areas."
According to documents discovered from the Iraqi Jewish Archive, over 1,000 Jews were murdered or disappeared.

When the forces loyal to the regent entered to restore order, many rioters were killed. The Iraqi Commission Report noted that: "After some delay the Regent… arranged for the dispatch of troops to take control…  There was no more aimless firing into the air; their machine guns swept the streets clear of people and quickly put a stop to looting and rioting." The British Ambassador noted that the second day was more violent than the first, and that "Iraqi troops killed as many rioters as the rioters killed Jews." The Iraqi Commission Report estimated the total number of Jews and Muslims killed at 130. Eliahu Eilat, a Jewish Agency agent estimated 1,000 as the total number of Jews and Muslims who died, with other similar accounts estimating 300–400 rioters killed by the Regent's army.

Aftermath

Iraqi Monarchist response
Within a week of the riots, on 7 June, the reinstated Monarchist Iraqi government set up a Committee of Enquiry to investigate the events. According to Peter Wien, the regime "made every effort to present the followers of the Rashid 'Ali movement as proxies of Nazism".

The monarchist government acted quickly to suppress supporters of Rashid Ali. Many Iraqis were exiled as a result, and hundreds were jailed. Eight men, included amongst them Iraqi Army officers and policemen, were legally sentenced to death in consequence of the violence by the newly established pro-British Iraqi government.

Long-term impact

In some accounts the Farhud marked the turning point for Iraq's Jews. Other historians, however, see the pivotal moment for the Iraqi Jewish community much later, between 1948 and 1951, since Jewish communities prospered along with the rest of the country throughout most of the 1940s, and many Jews who left Iraq following the Farhud returned to the country shortly thereafter and permanent emigration did not accelerate significantly until 1950–51. Bashkin writes that "In the context of Jewish-Iraqi history, moreover, a distinction should be made between an analysis of the Farhud and the Farhudization of Jewish Iraqi history—viewing the Farhud as typifying the history of the relationship between Jews and greater Iraqi society. The Jewish community strived for integration in Iraq before and after the Farhud. In fact, the attachment of the community to Iraq was so tenacious that even after such a horrible event, most Jews continued to believe that Iraq was their homeland."

Either way, the Farhud is broadly understood to mark the start of a process of politicization of the Iraqi Jews in the 1940s, primarily amongst the younger population, especially as a result of the impact it had on hopes of long term integration into Iraqi society. In the direct aftermath of the Farhud, many joined the Iraqi Communist Party in order to protect the Jews of Baghdad, yet they did not want to leave the country and rather sought to fight for better conditions in Iraq itself. At the same time the Iraqi government which had taken over after the Farhud reassured the Iraqi Jewish community, and normal life soon returned to Baghdad, which saw a marked betterment of its economic situation during World War II.

It was only after the Iraqi government initiated a policy shift towards the Iraqi Jews in 1948, curtailing their civil rights and firing many Jewish state employees, that the Farhud began to be regarded as more than just an outburst of violence instigated by foreign influences, namely Nazi propaganda.

On October 23, 1948, Shafiq Ades, a respected Jewish businessman, was publicly hanged in Basra on charges of selling weapons to Israel and the Iraqi Communist Party, despite the fact he was an outspoken anti-Zionist. The event increased the sense of insecurity among Jews. The Jewish community general sentiment was that if a man as well connected and powerful as Shafiq Ades could be eliminated by the state, other Jews would not be protected any longer, and the Farhud was no longer seen as an isolated incident. During this period, the Iraqi Jewish community became increasingly fearful.

Remembrances
A monument, called Prayer, located in Ramat Gan, is in memory of the Jews who were killed in Iraq during the Farhud and in the 1960s.

June 1, 2015, was the first International Farhud Day at the United Nations.

See also
 1945 Anti-Jewish riots in Tripolitania
 1947 Aden riots
 Antisemitism in the Arab world
 Islam and antisemitism
 List of massacres in Iraq
 Shafiq Ades
 The Legacy of Islamic Antisemitism
 Al-Muthanna Club

Notes

References

Further reading
 Kedouri Elie (1974) The Sack of Basra and the Farhud in Baghdad (Arabic Political Memoirs. London), pp. 283–314.
 Shamash, Violette (2008, 2010) Memories of Eden: A Journey Through Jewish Baghdad (Forum Books, London; Northwestern University Press, Evanston, IL, USA) .
 Nissim Kazzaz, "Report of the Governmental Commission of Inquiry on the Events of June 1–2, 1941," Pe’amim 8 (1981), pp. 46–59 [Hebrew].

External links
 The Farhud of 1941 in Iraq.
 The Jews of Iraq
 Baghdad & Forgotten Pogrom  by Edwin Black (The Jewish Times) October 5, 2004
 The terror behind Iraq's Jewish exodus, The Telegraph, 16 Apr 2003.
 JIMENA
 Babylonian Jewry Heritage Center
 The Iraqi Jews
 Hebrew documentary video about the Farhud
 bbc.co.uk
 The expulsion that backfired: When Iraq kicked out its Jews
 Remembering The Farhud - Website dedicated to the Baghdad Pogrom

Anti-Jewish pogroms by Muslims 1941-49
Anti-Jewish pogroms by Muslims
Antisemitism in Iraq
20th century in Baghdad
World War II crimes
Massacres in 1941
Middle East theatre of World War II
Massacres in Iraq
1941 in Iraq
Conflicts in 1941
Jews and Judaism in Baghdad
Iraqi war crimes
1941 in Judaism
Islam and antisemitism
Anti-Jewish pogroms
History of Baghdad
History of Iraq
The Holocaust
Judaism in Iraq
Iraq in World War II
Genocidal massacres